Robert Dubreuil (born 20 April 1967) is a Canadian speed skater. He competed in the men's 500 metres event at the 1992 Winter Olympics.

References

External links
 

1967 births
Living people
Canadian male speed skaters
Olympic speed skaters of Canada
Speed skaters at the 1992 Winter Olympics
Speed skaters from Quebec City
20th-century Canadian people